The 6th European Athletics Championships were held from 19–24 August 1958 in the Olympic Stadium of Stockholm, Sweden.  Contemporaneous reports on the event were given in the Glasgow Herald.

Medal summary
Complete results were published.

Men

Women

Medal table

Participation
According to an unofficial count, 629 athletes from 26 countries participated in the event, three athletes more than the official number of 626 as published.  A joint German team comprising athletes from both East and West Germany was competing.  Assignment of the athletes to East or West Germany was accomplished using the database of Deutsche Gesellschaft für Leichtathletik-Dokumentation 1990 e.V.

 (15)
 (13)
 (8)
 (24)
 (9)
 (29)
 (38)
 (76)
 (25)
 (51)
 (14)
 (22)
 (9)
 (4)
 (35)
 (1)
 (21)
 (25)
 (49)
 (1)
 (7)
 (68)
 (7)
 (48)
 (23)
 (5)
 (55)
 (23)

References

External links 
 European Athletics
 Athletix

 
European Athletics Championships
European Athletics Championships
European Athletics Championships
International athletics competitions hosted by Sweden
European Athletics Championships
International sports competitions in Stockholm
European Athletics Championships
European Athletics Championships, 1958